Saint Marcellus may refer to:

Pope Marcellus I
Marcellus of Capua
Marcellus of Tangier

fr:Saint Marcel
it:San Marcello